Daniel Lum On (born 1962) is a Fijian international lawn bowler.

Bows career
Lum On won the gold medal in the triples with Semesa Naiseruvati and Samuela Tuikiligana at the 2011 Asia Pacific Bowls Championships in Adelaide.

He was selected to represent Fiji at the 2014 Commonwealth Games, where he competed in the triples and fours events.

References

1962 births
Fijian male bowls players
Living people
Sportspeople from Suva
Bowls players at the 2014 Commonwealth Games
Commonwealth Games competitors for Fiji